Stephen Bourne (born 31 October 1957) is a British writer, film and social historian specialising in Black heritage and gay culture. As noted by the BBC among others, Bourne "has discovered many stories that have remained untold for years".

In October 2019, Booker Prize winner Bernardine Evaristo voted Bourne for her Black History Month hero on Facebook. She said: "Stephen Bourne is a hero of our history, who has published countless books, always accessible to all, on the hidden stories of our presence on these shores. Let's honour Stephen for quietly shining a light on our history."

In 2019, the acclaimed writer Russell T Davies (Queer as Folk, It's a Sin) described Bourne in his foreword to Playing Gay in the Golden Age of British Television as "one of the soldiers, gatekeepers and champions of our community. I am in awe of his diligence and insight."

Early life and education

Bourne was born in Camberwell, south-east London, and raised in Peckham. He attended Oliver Goldsmith Primary School from 1962 to 1969 and St. Michael and All Angels Secondary Modern School from 1969 to 1974. He left school educationally disadvantaged in 1974 but was encouraged to join the sixth form of Archbishop Temple's, a comprehensive school in Lambeth, from 1974 to 1975. When Temple's closed, he transferred to the sixth form of Archbishop Michael Ramsey Comprehensive School in Camberwell.

Though Bourne did not do well enough to go to university, he later graduated from the London College of Printing (now known as the London College of Communication) with a bachelor's degree in film and television in 1988, and in 2006 received a Master of Philosophy degree at De Montfort University on the subject of the representation of gay men in British Television Drama 1936–79.

Career

After graduating in 1988, he was a research officer at the British Film Institute on a ground-breaking project that documented the history of Black people in British television. The result was a two-part television documentary called Black and White in Colour (BBC 1992), directed by Isaac Julien.

In 1991, Bourne was a founder member of the Black and Asian Studies Association with, amongst others, Hakim Adi and Marika Sherwood. Since 2004 he has written more than fifty entries for the Oxford Dictionary of National Biography. In 2008 he researched Keep Smiling Through – Black Londoners on the Home Front 1939–1945, an exhibition for the Cuming Museum in the London Borough of Southwark and that same year he worked as a historical consultant on the Imperial War Museum's War to Windrush exhibition.

Bonnie Greer, playwright and critic, has said: "Stephen Bourne brings great natural scholarship and passion to a largely hidden story. He is highly accessible, accurate and surprising. You always walk away from his work knowing something that you didn't know, that you didn't even suspect".

In 1991, Bourne co-authored The Sun Shone on Our Side of the Street: Aunt Esther's Story with Esther Bruce (his adopted aunt), which was published by the Ethnic Communities Oral History Project (ECOHP). He has written books about significant Black personalities such as Elisabeth Welch, Ethel Waters, Evelyn Dove and Harold Moody, as well as about different aspects of the historical Black presence in Britain.  In 2014, Bourne's book Black Poppies: Britain's Black Community and the Great War was published by The History Press. Reviewing it in The Independent, Bernardine Evaristo said: "Until historians and cultural map-makers stop ignoring the historical presence of people of colour, books such as this one provide a powerful, revelatory counterbalance to the whitewashing of British history."

A contributor to the gay press for many years, Bourne was the film critic for Gay Times in the early 1990s, and in 1996 his acclaimed book Brief Encounters, a survey of gay cinema in Britain, was published. In 1992 he curated Out of the Archives, the first of many successful LGBT television retrospectives for BFI Southbank.

In 1995, in the London Borough of Southwark, Bourne was instrumental in setting up one of the first locally-based multi-agency forums to combat homophobic crime. Since 1999 he has been active in his community as an independent adviser to the Metropolitan Police.

From 1998 to 2005, Bourne was a regular contributor to Black Filmmaker Magazine (bfm), the first Black film publication aimed at the global black filmmaking industry. It was founded and edited by the film-maker Menelik Shabazz.

Following the publication of the Commission on Race and Ethnic Disparities in March 2021, Bourne revealed he was listed as a contributor to the report without his knowledge, stating that he felt manipulated.

Awards

In 2002 Bourne received the Metropolitan Police Volunteer Award for his work as independent adviser on critical incidents. It was presented to him by Police Commissioner Sir John Stevens at City Hall, London. In 2013 Bourne was nominated for a Southwark Heritage Blue Plaque for his work as a community historian and Southwark Police independent adviser. He came second with 1,025 votes.

In June 2015, at Southwark's Unicorn Theatre, the Southwark Arts Forum presented Bourne with their Literature Award for Black Poppies. In May 2017, he was honoured at the 12th Screen Nation Awards with a special award for his years of work documenting the lives of Black Britons in film and television. In 2017 he received an Honorary Fellowship from London South Bank University for his contribution to diversity. In 2022 Bourne was shortlisted for The Society for Theatre Research book prize for Deep Are the Roots: Trailblazers Who Changed Black British Theatre. On 21 May 2022 at a Civic Award ceremony in Southwark Cathedral Bourne was awarded the Freedom of Southwark.

TV and radio

Bourne's radio appearances have included Miss Lou at RADA (2005) with Yvonne Brewster, Raising the Bar (2015) with Sir Lenny Henry, From Shame to Pride (2017), The Film Programme (2018), Last Word (2019), The Secret History of a School (2019), Front Row (2019) and Four Thought (2020) all for BBC Radio 4; Free Thinking (2021) for BBC Radio 3; The Raw Pearl Bailey (2018) for BBC Radio 2; and Robert Elms Show (2019) for BBC Radio London. His television appearances include Black Divas (Channel 4, 1996); American Masters – Paul Robeson: Here I Stand (1999); The One Show (BBC1, 2013 and 2020 (Black History Month special)); The Culture Show: Swingin' into the Blitz (BBC2, 2016) and Home Front Heroes (More4, 2016). 

In 2018, Bourne was interviewed about his Evelyn Dove photograph collection for BBC1's Antiques Roadshow. In 2021, he was interviewed about Evelyn Dove, Adelaide Hall and Ken 'Snakehips' Johnson in the series The Definitive History of Jazz in Britain, presented by Clive Myrie for Jazz FM. In 2022, Bourne paid tribute to Sidney Poitier in BBC Radio 4's Last Word, was interviewed about Samuel Coleridge-Taylor's daughter, the composer and conductor Avril Coleridge-Taylor in BBC Radio 3's Hidden Women and Silenced Scores and contributed to BBC Radio 4's Great Lives profile of Ira Aldridge.  

In 1993, for Salutations, Bourne received a Race in the Media Award for Best Radio Documentary from the Commission for Racial Equality (CRE). Salutations was a nine-part series which Bourne conceived and scripted for Ladbroke Radio/BBC Radio 2 that celebrated the achievements of Black African, Caribbean and British singers and musicians from the 1930s to the 1960s. Subjects included Leslie 'Hutch' Hutchinson, Reginald Foresythe, Evelyn Dove, Leslie Thompson, Leslie 'Jiver' Hutchinson, Ken 'Snakehips' Johnson, Cyril Blake, Rudolph Dunbar, Fela Sowande, Edric Connor, Winifred Atwell, Ray Ellington, Cy Grant, Geoff Love and Shirley Bassey. The following year Bourne received a second CRE award in the same category for Black in the West End, a celebration of Black musical theatre in London's West End.

Black British theatre

Bourne has been the recipient of two research grants for Black British theatre from The Society for Theatre Research (1999) and a Wingate Scholarship (2011). He compiled a database of "Key Black Productions to 1975" for the Theatre Museum's publication Black and Asian Performance at the Theatre Museum: A User's Guide (2003). 

Bourne participated in Warwick University's Shakespeare symposium with the presentation "Beyond Paul Robeson...Black British Actors and Shakespeare 1930–1965" (July 2013) and the Royal National Theatre's Palimpsest Talk: Symposium – A Celebration of Black Women in Theatre (December 2017). Bourne was interviewed in the documentary Margins to Mainstream: The Story of Black Theatre in Britain (2012). Bourne's Deep Are the Roots - Trailblazers Who Changed Black British Theatre was published by The History Press in 2021.

Publications
 The Sun Shone on Our Side of the Street: Aunt Esther's Story, with Esther Bruce, ECOHP, 1991, 
 Brief Encounters: Lesbians and Gays in British Cinema 1930–71, Cassell, 1996, 
 Aunt Esther's Story, with Esther Bruce, ECOHP, 1996, 
 Black in the British Frame: Black People in British Film and Television 1896-1996, Cassell, 1998, 
 A Ship and a Prayer: The Black Presence in Hammersmith and Fulham, with Sav Kyriacou, ECOHP, 1999, 
 Black in the British Frame: The Black Experience in British Film and Television, Cassell/Continuum, 2001, 
 Sophisticated Lady: A Celebration of Adelaide Hall, ECOHP, 2001, 
 Elisabeth Welch: Soft Lights and Sweet Music, Scarecrow Press, 2005, 
 Speak of Me As I Am: The Black Presence in Southwark Since 1600, Southwark Council, 2005, 
 Ethel Waters: Stormy Weather, Scarecrow Press, 2007, 
 Butterfly McQueen Remembered, Scarecrow Press, 2008, 
 Dr. Harold Moody, Southwark Council, 2008, 
 Mother Country: Britain's Black Community on the Home Front 1939–45, The History Press, 2010, 
 Nina Mae McKinney: The Black Garbo, BearManor Media, 2011,  
 The Motherland Calls: Britain's Black Servicemen and Women 1939–1945, The History Press, 2012, 
 Esther Bruce: A Black London Seamstress, with Esther Bruce, History and Social Action Publications, 2012, 
 Black Poppies: Britain's Black Community and the Great War, The History Press, 2014, 
 Evelyn Dove: Britain's Black Cabaret Queen, Jacaranda Books, 2016, 
 Fighting Proud: The Untold Story of the Gay Men Who Served in Two World Wars, I.B.Tauris, 2017/Bloomsbury Academic, 2019, 
 War to Windrush: Black Women in Britain 1939–1948, Jacaranda Books, 2018, 
 Black Poppies: Britain's Black Community and the Great War (2nd edition, revised and updated), The History Press, 2019, 
 Playing Gay in the Golden Age of British Television, The History Press, 2019, 
 Under Fire: Black Britain in Wartime 1939-45, The History Press, 2020,   
 Deep Are the Roots: Trailblazers Who Changed Black British Theatre, The History Press, 2021, 
 Black Poppies: The Story of Britain's Black Community in the First World War (Young Readers Edition), The History Press, 2022

Contributor

 "Denying Her Place: Hattie McDaniel's Surprising Acts", in P. Cook and P. Dodd (eds), Women and Film: A Sight and Sound Reader, Scarlet Press, 1993, 
 "Secrets and Lies: Black Histories and British Historical Films", in C. Monk and A. Sargeant (eds), British Historical Cinema, Routledge, 2002, 
 "Behind the Masks: Anthony Asquith and Brian Desmond Hurst", in R. Griffiths (ed.), British Queer Cinema, Routledge, 2006, 
 D. Dabydeen, J. Gilmore and C. Jones (eds), The Oxford Companion to Black British History, Oxford University Press, 2007,

References

External links
 Stephen Bourne official website.
 "Stephen Bourne" at History Today
 

1957 births
Living people
People from Camberwell
British writers
Alumni of De Montfort University
British film historians
English gay writers
LGBT historians